Mikhaēl IV may refer to:

 Michael IV the Paphlagonian (1010–1041)
 Patriarch Michael IV of Constantinople (died in 1214)